Alpha Girls is a 2013 comedy horror film directed by Tony Trov and Johnny Zito and starring Falon Joslyn, Nikki Bell and featuring Ron Jeremy and Schoolly D.

Premise
Hoping to make a fresh start, Morgan (Falon Joslyn) comes to a new school and the sorority she's heard about all of her life, Alpha Beta. While her initial greetings from Sorority President Veronica (Nikki Bell) are less than warm, Morgan finds her place in the new pledge class and a kindred spirit in Cassidy (Beverly Rivera). However the rushes learn that Alpha Beta isn't as squeaky clean as they think and Alpha House is tainted by a malevolence from another world. Morgan must find a way to save herself and her friends from the oncoming darkness.

Production
Production took place on location during the hottest summer ever recorded in Philadelphia, Pennsylvania.

Reception
HorrorNews.net and Ain't It Cool News both reviewed the film favorably, the former stating that "The film could have quickly taken the exploitation route and for a moment I thought it would, instead it surprised me by being smart, quick witted, and a completely entertaining horror comedy."

Alpha Girls won the "Feature Length Indie Film of the Year" category of the 2012 Philadelphia Geek Awards

References

External links
 
 

2013 films
2013 horror films
American comedy horror films
Films about fraternities and sororities
Films set in Philadelphia
American slasher films
American independent films
American science fiction comedy films
American science fiction horror films
2010s English-language films
Films set in Pennsylvania
Films shot in Philadelphia
2013 comedy horror films
2013 comedy films
2010s American films
English-language comedy horror films